Lilly Bridge is a historic stone arch bridge located at Lilly in Cambria County, Pennsylvania. It was built by the Allegheny Portage Railroad in 1832, and is an  bridge, with an elliptical shape and curved wingalls. It is built of roughly squared ashlar and crosses Burgoon Run.

It was listed on the National Register of Historic Places in 1988.

See also
List of bridges documented by the Historic American Engineering Record in Pennsylvania

References

External links

Historic American Engineering Record in Pennsylvania
Railroad bridges on the National Register of Historic Places in Pennsylvania
Bridges completed in 1832
Bridges in Cambria County, Pennsylvania
National Register of Historic Places in Cambria County, Pennsylvania
Stone arch bridges in the United States